Daniele Ferrazza (born 16 March 1993 in Trento) is an Italian curler from Cembra. He competed at the 2015 Ford World Men's Curling Championship in Halifax, Nova Scotia, Canada, as second for the Italian team.

Personal life
Ferazza is employed as a carpenter

References

1993 births
Living people
Italian male curlers
Sportspeople from Trento
Curlers at the 2018 Winter Olympics
Olympic curlers of Italy